Van Veeteren is a fictional retired Detective Chief Inspector and the main character in a series of ten novels by Håkan Nesser, of which nine have been filmed. In the films, Van Veeteren is portrayed by Sven Wollter.

Setting
The novels take place in a fictional town called Maardam, situated somewhere in a European country resembling the Netherlands, Sweden, Germany and Poland. Maardam has around 300 000 inhabitants (according to the first novel, The Mind's Eye).

Character profile
The main character, Van Veeteren, is in his sixties. In the first five novels he is still a Detective Chief Inspector; in the last five novels he is retired, but sometimes he leaves his antiquarian book store to help out with investigations. In his youth, he was a student at the university of Maardam. Van Veeteren is a bit grumpy and cynical, enjoys dark beer and chess. He has two children, Erich (black sheep of the family with criminal history) and Jess (who moved to France, got married and has two children). Van Veeteren is divorced, but meets a new woman, Ulrike Fremdli, during the series. Van Veeteren is very intuitive when it comes to reading people. He has only one unsolved case in his résumé, The Case G.

References

Characters in crime novel series
Fictional police detectives
Films set in Europe
Literary characters introduced in 1993
Book series introduced in 1993